Dione Lucas (born Dione Wilson, 10 October 1909 – 18 December 1971) (pronounced dee-OH-nee) was an English chef, and the first female graduate of Le Cordon Bleu. Her father was the architect, jeweller and designer Henry Wilson, and her sister was the violinist Orrea Pernel (1906-1993). She married another architect, Colin Lucas (1906-1984).

Life
Dione Lucas was fundamental in establishing an extension of the famous Paris culinary school in London in the 1930s. She married the architect Colin Lucas. on 9 April 1930. In 1931 she and Rosemary Hume (with whom she has trained in Paris), set up a cookery school in Sloane Street, London, the interior of which was designed by Colin Lucas. They had a flat in Chelsea and they would reputedly serve their students' creations to passing trade at chairs and tables on the pavement. Lucas is thought to have helped Hume create her first cookery book, as Hume's spelling was known to be poor.

Lucas worked as a hotel chef in Hamburg before World War II and later claimed that Adolf Hitler often dined there and had a taste for stuffed squab. She later opened a Cordon Bleu restaurant and a cooking school in New York - on the ground floor of 117 E. 60th St. She also ran the Egg Basket restaurant by Bloomingdale's in New York. One of the earliest television cook-show hosts, Lucas's To The Queen's Taste was broadcast on CBS in 1948-1949 from the restaurant. She had another show in the 1950s.

Dione Lucas was the first woman featured in a cooking show on television on WPIX-11 in New York. In one of her New York restaurants, The Gingerman, Lucas helped to introduce the omelette to the American palate.
She can be seen as a predecessor and influence to Julia Child. 
Dione Lucas authored several cookbooks on French cuisine.

Quotes
"The preparation of good food is merely another expression of art, one of the joys of civilized living."
"I do not mean to spoil your appetite for stuffed squab, but you might be interested to know that it was a great favorite with Mr. Hitler, who dined at the hotel often. Let us not hold that against a fine recipe though."

Works

Books
 Au Petit Cordon Bleu: an array of recipes from the ‘École du Petit cordon bleu  (1936, with Rosemary Hume) (29 Sloane Street, London)
The Cordon Bleu Cook Book (1947)
The Dione Lucas Meat and Poultry Cook Book (1955, with Anne Roe Robbins)  324 pages. Illustrated.
 Good Cooking. (1960) 64 pages.Illustrated. (Australian Consolidated Press, Sydney) 
Gourmet Cooking School Cookbook (1964) (Bernard Geis Associates)
 The Dione Lucas Book of French Cooking (1973 with Marion Gorman)
The Dione Lucas Book of Natural French Cooking (1977, with Marion & Felipe Alba)
Gourmet Cooking School Cookbook (1982 with Darlene Geis)

Television
To The Queen's Taste (December 1946 - 1948) ABC
The Dione Lucas Cooking School (February 25, 1948-December 29, 1949) CBS
The Dione Lucas Cooking Show (1950-1956) CBS
The Dione Lucas Hour (1956-1958) Syndicated
 Dione Lucas’s Gourmet Club (1958-1960) Syndicated
Dollars and Sense Cooking (1960-1962) Syndicated

External links
Papers of Dione Lucas, ca.1930-1995. Schlesinger Library, Radcliffe Institute, Harvard University.

References 

British television chefs
1909 births
1971 deaths
Alumni of Le Cordon Bleu